St. Andrew's Presbyterian Church is a Presbyterian church congregation located in Quebec City, Quebec, Canada. It belongs to the Presbyterian Church in Canada denomination.

History
The congregation's roots began with the British conquest of Quebec at the Plains of Abraham in 1759. Under the leadership of Church of Scotland Chaplain Robert MacPherson and soldiers of the famous 78th Fraser Highlanders of James Wolfe's Army in 1759. A congregation evolved under his leadership, until his death in 1765. He was succeeded by another former Chaplain, George Henry.

With the 1763 Treaty, and the coming of merchants from Scotland and New England, the congregation soon assumed civilian status and was known as the Scotch Congregation - in connection with the Church of Scotland.

During the 1802 ministry of Alexander Spark, in response to a petition signed by 148 persons, the present Church site was granted by His Majesty George III, although it was not until 1807 that construction began.

The long-contemplated Church was dedicated on November 30, 1810, on St. Andrew's Day, and appropriately named after the apostle. The building remains virtually unchanged but for the addition of the Vestry in 1900.

On the same triangular site with the church are the Kirk Hall, first erected in 1829 as a Protestant School which continued as a flourishing scholastic institution for many years; and the magnificent Manse erected in 1837, which was the residence of the ministers until 2017. William Reed was notably the church's organist from 1900-1913.

Ministers
 Robert MacPherson, 1759-1765+
 George Henry, 1765-1784
 Alexander Spark, DD, 1784-1819   
 James Harkness, DD, 1820-1835+
 John Cook, DD, LLD 1836-1883, Moderator of the first General Assembly of the Presbyterian Church in Canada, June 1875.
 Andrew Tannahill Love, DD, 1884-1925
 Alexander M. Gordon, DD, 1926-1941
 Harold W. Reid, DD, 1941-1945
 Donald Mackay, DD, 1945-1950
 Wilfred Butcher, DD, 1951-1964
 Edward Bragg, DD, 1964-1977
 P. Lyle Sams, 1979-1990
 Donald J. M. Corbett, PhD 1991+, former Principal of Knox College,
 Mrs. Tamiko Nakamura Corbett, Diaconal Minister, 1992-1993, Moderator of the Presbyterian Church in Canada's General Assembly, 1996.
 Ronald H. Balston, 1993-1996
 Scott Emery, 1996-2000
 Bradley Nelson (Interim Minister), 2001-2003
 Stephen A. Hayes, DD, 2004-2009
 Katherine Burgess, DMin, 2009–present 
+Died in Office.

References

External links

 http://www.standrewsquebeccity.sitew.ca/#Home.A
 https://saintandrewsquebeccity.wordpress.com

Presbyterian churches in Canada
Churches in Quebec City
Presbyterian organizations established in the 18th century
19th-century Presbyterian church buildings in Canada
Churches completed in 1810
1810 establishments in Lower Canada
Quebec Anglophone culture in Quebec City
Scottish-Canadian culture